António Paulo Sanches Semedo (born 1 June 1979) is a Portuguese retired footballer. Operating as a winger or a second striker, he was nicknamed "the Black Panther".

After starting out at Casa Pia, Semedo amassed Primeira Liga totals of 97 games and 11 goals over the course of three seasons with Estrela Amadora, where he played six years overall. He also competed professionally for CFR Cluj, Steaua București and Unirea Urziceni in Romania, Alki Larnaca in Cyprus, and Khazar Lankaran in Azerbaijan.

Internationally, Semedo earned 16 caps for Portugal at  under-21 level between 2000 and 2002.

Club career
After beginning his professional career in his local Lisbon area with modest Casa Pia AC, Semedo moved to C.F. Estrela da Amadora in 2000. He went on to establish himself as an important attacking element, whether as a starter or from the bench—in his last season he scored six goals in 32 games, helping the capital side finish ninth in the Primeira Liga after having promoted from the second division the previous campaign.

In 2006–07, Semedo joined Romania's CFR Cluj, as the Liga I team was filled with Portuguese players. After good displays during two seasons, and a double in his last, he moved to FC Steaua București. On 13 September 2008, Semedo scored from a corner kick on his debut, as Steaua won 4–1 against FC Farul Constanța. The following week, he netted a brace in the 4–0 victory over CS Gaz Metan Mediaș.

For 2009–10, Semedo was initially demoted to the B-squad. Several weeks later his contract was terminated, but he stayed in the country and signed with FC Unirea Urziceni. In the summer of 2011, Semedo penned a one-year contract with FK Khazar Lankaran from the Azerbaijan Premier League. He retired at the end of the season, aged 33.

International career
Semedo played at the 2002 UEFA European Championship for the Portuguese under-21s, who finished third in their group.

Personal life
After retiring as a footballer, Semedo relocated to England with his wife and children.

Honours
CFR Cluj
Liga I: 2007–08
Cupa României: 2007–08

References

External links

1979 births
Living people
Portuguese people of Cape Verdean descent
Footballers from Lisbon
Portuguese footballers
Association football wingers
Primeira Liga players
Liga Portugal 2 players
Casa Pia A.C. players
C.F. Estrela da Amadora players
Liga I players
CFR Cluj players
FC Steaua București players
FC Steaua II București players
FC Unirea Urziceni players
Cypriot First Division players
Alki Larnaca FC players
Azerbaijan Premier League players
Khazar Lankaran FK players
Portugal under-21 international footballers
Portuguese expatriate footballers
Expatriate footballers in Romania
Expatriate footballers in Cyprus
Expatriate footballers in Azerbaijan
Portuguese expatriate sportspeople in Romania
Portuguese expatriate sportspeople in Cyprus
Portuguese expatriate sportspeople in Azerbaijan